Home, Sweet Home (1914) is an American silent biographical drama directed by D. W. Griffith. It stars Earle Foxe, Henry Walthall and Dorothy Gish.

Plot 
John Howard Payne leaves home and begins a career in the theater.  Despite encouragement from his mother and girlfriend, Payne begins to lead a dissolute life that leads to ruin and depression.  In deep despair, he thinks of better days, and writes a song, Home! Sweet Home! that later provides inspiration to several others in their own times of need.

Cast 
 Henry B. Walthall ....  John Howard Payne
 Josephine Crowell ....  Payne's Mother
 Lillian Gish ....  Payne's Sweetheart
 Dorothy Gish ....  Sister of Payne's Sweetheart
 Fay Tincher ....  The Worldly Woman
 Mae Marsh ....  Apple Pie Mary
 Spottiswoode Aitken ....  Mary's Father
 Robert Harron ....  The Easterner, Robert Winthrop
 Miriam Cooper ....  The Fiancée
 Mary Alden ....  The Mother
 Donald Crisp ....  The Mother's Son
 Earle Foxe
 James Kirkwood ....  The Mother's Son
 Jack Pickford ....  The Mother's Son
 Fred Burns ....  The sheriff
 Courtenay Foote ....  The Husband
 Blanche Sweet .... The Wife

See also
Lillian Gish filmography
Blanche Sweet filmography

References

External links 

1914 films
American silent feature films
Films directed by D. W. Griffith
American black-and-white films
Articles containing video clips
American biographical drama films
1910s biographical drama films
1914 drama films
1910s American films
Silent American drama films
1910s English-language films